Art Seaman (January 17, 1923 – September 10, 2007) was an American speed skater. He competed in the men's 10,000 metres event at the 1948 Winter Olympics.

References

1923 births
2007 deaths
American male speed skaters
Olympic speed skaters of the United States
Speed skaters at the 1948 Winter Olympics
Sportspeople from Minneapolis